Dasharathaiah Sudhakar is an Indian politician from the state of Karnataka. He is a three term member of the Karnataka Legislative Assembly.

He was elected from Challakere in 2004 and from Hiriyur in 2008 and 2013. He was Social Welfare Minister during B. S. Yediyurappa's tenure as Chief Minister.

References 

Living people
Karnataka MLAs 2008–2013
Karnataka MLAs 2013–2018
1961 births